Lewis Marc Capaldi (born 7 October 1996) is a Scottish singer-songwriter and musician. He was nominated for the Critics' Choice Award at the 2019 Brit Awards. In March 2019, his single "Someone You Loved" topped the UK Singles Chart where it remained for seven weeks, and in November 2019, it reached number one on the US Billboard Hot 100; it was nominated at the 62nd Annual Grammy Awards for Song of the Year and won the 2020 Brit Award for Song of the Year. Capaldi also won the 2020 Brit Award for Best New Artist.

On 17 May 2019, he released his debut album, Divinely Uninspired to a Hellish Extent, which remained at the top of the UK Albums Chart for six weeks. It later went on to become the best selling album of 2019 and 2020 in the UK, and "Someone You Loved" was the best selling single of 2019 in the UK. In May 2020, it was announced that Capaldi's song "Someone You Loved" had become the longest-running top 10 UK single of all time by a British artist.

Early life
Capaldi was born in Glasgow, Scotland, and lived there until he was 4 years old before the family moved to Bathgate in West Lothian. Capaldi is of Scottish, Irish and Italian ancestry. He is the youngest of four children. His birth came as a surprise to his family after his father underwent a vasectomy. Capaldi's passion for performing started after he sang on stage at the age of 4 on a family trip in France. He learned how to play guitar when he was nine. Soon, he began writing songs, and playing gigs by sneaking into pubs with the help of his eldest brother.

Career

2014–2016: Beginnings
In 2014 Capaldi took part in a three-date tour as part of the Hit the Road project run by The Scottish Music Centre. He played in Dumfries, Edinburgh and Fort William alongside Jacob and Rory Green and Zoë Bestel. When he was 18, his manager Ryan Walter discovered him by an iPhone recording that was recorded in his bedroom and had uploaded to his SoundCloud account. The day after first contacting Capaldi, Walter flew from America to Britain to hear Capaldi play live. In 2016, Capaldi graduated with an HND in Music from New College Lanarkshire, Motherwell.

2017–2018: Extended plays and increased recognition

He released his first single "Bruises" independently on 31 March 2017. The song quickly amassed close to 28 million plays on Spotify worldwide, making him the fastest ever unsigned artist to reach 25 million plays on the platform. Shortly afterwards, he was signed to the German branch of Universal Music Group, and was assigned to the Vertigo Berlin division. His releases are distributed in the UK by Virgin EMI Records and in the US by Capitol Records. The track, as well as the singles "Lost on You" and "Fade" were featured on his first extended play Bloom  and later on his debut album. After the release of the album, "Bruises" was re-released as a single. A music video for the song and a special EP containing various versions of the track were released, propelling for it to reach no.6 on the UK Singles Chart. He supported Rag'n'Bone Man and Jake Bugg in the fall of 2017.

In January 2018, he joined  Milky Chance on their North American leg of the Blossom tour. On 23 February, his collaboration "Rush" with Jessie Reyez was released. His music attracted attention from celebrities including Chloë Grace Moretz, Ellie Goulding, and Niall Horan. Subsequently, Horan invited Capaldi to support him on two dates on his Flicker World Tour at the Glasgow SEC Armadillo in March. In May, Capaldi joined Sam Smith on their The Thrill of It All European Tour, opening for Smith over 19 dates. He followed this by announcing a fourth headline UK and European tour, this time playing 2000 capacity venues across the UK and Europe, including two nights at Glasgow's Barrowland Ballroom, with both shows selling out. Capaldi was named as one of Vevo DSCVR 'Artists to Watch 2018' and he won Best Acoustic Act at the Scottish Alternative Music Awards. He was also long-listed for BBC Music's Sound of 2018. On 13 July Capaldi was named as one of two acts in BBC Radio 1's Brit List, guaranteeing him three successive incremental Radio 1 playlist places. In August, Irish Indie rock band Kodaline invited Capaldi to open for them at a concert in Belfast. In addition to this, Capaldi was included in the line-ups for many festivals during the summer of 2018, including: Lollapalooza, Bonnaroo, Firefly, Mountain Jam, Osheaga, Reading & Leeds Festival, Rize and TRNSMT. On 8 November, Capaldi's second extended play Breach, which included his single "Tough" was released.

2019–2020: Divinely Uninspired to a Hellish Extent
The Breach track "Someone You Loved" became Capaldi's breakthrough single, charting in 29 countries. During his 2019 tour with Bastille, the song reached number one on the UK Singles Chart and remained at the position for 7 weeks. It also reached number one on the Billboard Hot 100, making him the first Scottish solo artist to top the US charts since Sheena Easton in 1981. The song received a Grammy nomination for Song of the Year. According to the IFPI, the song was the 9th biggest global single of 2019. Another Breach track "Grace" reached a new peak of no.9 in the UK that year. Both songs were included on his debut album Divinely Uninspired to a Hellish Extent. The instant grant single "Hold Me While You Wait" entered the UK  Singles Chart at no. 4. The album was the biggest selling album in the UK in five years, spending five weeks at number one in its first six weeks of release.

Capaldi was nominated for the Brit Critics' Choice Award at the 2019 Brit Awards, but lost to Sam Fender. At the end of March, Capaldi supported Picture This at their shows in Ireland. In April, the video game Days Gone that had featured his self-written song "Days Gone Quiet" in the end credits was released. The song received nominations from the Game Audio Network Guild Awards and the NAVGTR Awards.

Over the summer of 2019, Capaldi performed at many festivals such as the Belsonic festival in Belfast, where he opened for The Killers, and the Glastonbury Festival.  On 5 August, he performed songs from his album with the Manchester Camerata for a special Live Lounge Symphony concert in Croxteth, Liverpool. From 16 to 26 August, he supported Ed Sheeran at the end of his Divide world tour, playing four gigs with him in Ipswich and Leeds. Towards the end of the year, an extended edition of his debut album was released along with the single "Before You Go", which became his second UK Singles Chart-topper on 31 January 2020.

Capaldi became the first artist to sell out an arena tour before the release of an album. The shows sold out in one second upon tickets becoming available, with Capaldi playing to over a quarter of a million people in March 2020. The initiative LiveLive [ ] was launched to help fans have a more comfortable experience at his concerts. At the 2020 Brit Awards, Capaldi received three nominations, winning two awards. Two songs written by Capaldi were also released that year: Rita Ora's "How to Be Lonely" and Sigala's "Lasting Lover".

2021–present: Broken by Desire to Be Heavenly Sent
In March 2021 Capaldi announced that he postponed all his upcoming shows to work on his upcoming sophomore album. It was announced in June that a documentary about Capaldi's career had been made. He returned in the summer of 2022 to play his postponed shows, including his headlining slots at the TRNSMT Festival, the Latitude Festival, and the Isle of Wight Festival. 

The lead single for his second album "Forget Me" was released in September 2022 and it became his first song to debut at the top of the UK Singles Chart. His line of frozen pizzas called Big Sexy Pizza was also released that month. In October, Capaldi announced that his newest album is titled Broken by Desire to Be Heavenly Sent and that it will be released on 19 May 2023. He achieved his fourth number-one single when "Pointless" climbed to the top in January 2023.

Personal life
Capaldi is known for his social media presence, particularly his humorous videos.  In September 2022 he revealed that he has been diagnosed with Tourette's syndrome.  He is a football fan and supports Celtic F.C.  On his father's side, his second cousin once removed is the actor Peter Capaldi, who appeared in his music video for "Someone You Loved".

Capaldi is dating Scottish model Ellie MacDowall.

Influences
Growing up, Capaldi listened to heavy metal bands including Slipknot and Avenged Sevenfold, pop-punk bands such as Blink-182 and Busted, and indie rock bands like Oasis and the View. He discovered a love for "soulful pop music" from the work of Paolo Nutini and Joe Cocker. Capaldi has expressed admiration for the 1975, the Macabees,  the Arctic Monkeys,  the Beatles, and Bob Dylan. Adele and Kings of Leon have also inspired his songwriting.

Discography

 Divinely Uninspired to a Hellish Extent (2019)
 Broken by Desire to Be Heavenly Sent (2023)

Awards and nominations

Tours

Headlining
 Divinely Uninspired to a Hellish Extent Tour (2019–2020)
 Broken by Desire to Be Heavenly Sent Tour (2023)

Supporting
Rag'n'Bone Man – The Overproof Tour (2017)
Milky Chance – The Blossom Tour (2018)
Niall Horan – Flicker World Tour (2018)
Sam Smith – The Thrill of It All Tour (2018)
Bastille – Still Avoiding Tomorrow Tour (2019)
Picture This – MDVRN LV Tour (2019)
Ed Sheeran – ÷ Tour (2019)

Filmography

References

External links

 Lewis Capaldi Profile on Agent Site 

1996 births
21st-century Scottish male singers
Living people
Scottish male singer-songwriters
Italian Scottish musicians
People from Bathgate
Scottish people of Italian descent
Brit Award winners
Scottish people of Irish descent